4804 Pasteur, provisional designation , is a carbonaceous background asteroid from the central regions of the asteroid belt, approximately 20 kilometers in diameter. It was discovered on 2 December 1989, by Belgian astronomer Eric Elst at the ESO's La Silla Observatory in Chile. The asteroid was named after French chemist and microbiologist Louis Pasteur.

Orbit and classification 

Pasteur is a non-family asteroid from the main belt's background population. It orbits the Sun in the intermediate asteroid belt at a distance of 2.4–3.0 AU once every 4 years and 5 months (1,612 days; semi-major axis of 2.69 AU). Its orbit has an eccentricity of 0.12 and an inclination of 9° with respect to the ecliptic.

The body's observation arc begins with a precovery taken at Palomar Observatory in March 1956, more than 33 years prior to its official discovery observation.

Physical characteristics 

In the SMASS classification, Pasteur is a C-type asteroid. Pan-STARRS photometric survey and SDSS–MFB (Masi–Foglia–Bus) have also characterized the body as a carbonaceous C-type.

Rotation period 

In November 2011, a rotational lightcurve of Pasteur was obtained from photometric observations by astronomers at the Oakley Southern Sky Observatory in Australia. Lightcurve analysis gave a well-defined rotation period of 13.69 hours with a brightness amplitude of 0.28 magnitude.

Diameter and albedo 

According to the surveys carried out by the Japanese Akari satellite and the NEOWISE mission of NASA's Wide-field Infrared Survey Explorer, Pasteur measures between 15.427 and 21.38 kilometers in diameter and its surface has an albedo between 0.05 and 0.1290.

The Collaborative Asteroid Lightcurve Link assumes an albedo of 0.10 and calculates a diameter of 15.98 kilometers based on an absolute magnitude of 12.1.

Naming 

This minor planet was named after French chemist and microbiologist Louis Pasteur (1822–1895), who discovered the principles of vaccination, fermentation and pasteurization. In 1888 the renowned Pasteur Institute was established in Paris. The official naming citation was published by the Minor Planet Center on 21 November 1991. The lunar crater Pasteur, as well as the Martian crater Pasteur have also been named after him.

References

External links 
 Asteroid Lightcurve Database (LCDB), query form (info )
 Dictionary of Minor Planet Names, Google books
 Asteroids and comets rotation curves, CdR – Observatoire de Genève, Raoul Behrend
 Discovery Circumstances: Numbered Minor Planets (1)-(5000) – Minor Planet Center
 
 

004804
Discoveries by Eric Walter Elst
Named minor planets
004804
19891202